Middlebrook Historic District is a national historic district located at Middlebrook, Augusta County, Virginia. It encompasses 50 contributing buildings and 52 contributing sites in the rural village of Middlebrook. Most of the buildings along the main street date to the 19th century. It primarily consists of vernacular houses and commercial buildings.  Non-residential buildings include five stores, a frame school building, two churches, an Odd Fellows Hall, and a shoemaker's (now beauty) shop.

It was listed on the National Register of Historic Places in 1983.

References

Historic districts in Augusta County, Virginia
National Register of Historic Places in Augusta County, Virginia
Historic districts on the National Register of Historic Places in Virginia